StandUp For Kids is a US 501(c)(3) not-for-profit organization founded in 1990. Its stated mission is to "End the Cycle of Youth Homelessness". StandUp For Kids is run almost entirely by volunteers and has established 18 outreach programs over the United States. It is dedicated to making a difference to at-risk or homeless kids.

Mission

The stated mission of StandUp For Kids is to "End the Cycle of Youth Homelessness". StandUp For Kids volunteers work directly with the homeless youth population and go on the streets to find, stabilize, and otherwise help homeless and street kids. StandUp For Kids also provides deterrence and resource programs in schools and via the internet.

Organization

StandUp For Kids is run almost entirely by volunteers, who fill a variety of positions including Executive Director, Public Relations Manager, Community Resource Director, Outreach and Apartment Support Directors, and Adult Training Directors.  StandUp For Kids is headquartered in Decatur, Georgia, US and has offices in other large cities, including Seattle, WA and Houston, TX.

National Homeless Youth Awareness Month
November was officially declared as National Homeless Youth Awareness Month by the United States Congress on July 11, 2007. National Homeless Youth Awareness Month was first officially recognized in November 2007.

References

External links
Official website

501(c)(3) organizations
Youth-led organizations
Homelessness organizations
Homelessness in the United States